The Hage Geingob Stadium (previously known as the South West Stadium) is a rugby stadium in Windhoek, Namibia. It is named after Hage Geingob, the President of Namibia. The stadium has a capacity of 10,000.
The stadium is commonly used by the Namibian national rugby union team who compete in the Africa Cup, and by the Welwitschias who compete in the Rugby Challenge.

In Media
This stadium was featured in the Rugby union video game series under the name "Windhoek".

See also
 Namibia national rugby union team

References

Buildings and structures in Windhoek
Sport in Windhoek
Sports venues in Namibia
Football venues in Namibia
Rugby union stadiums in Namibia